Kugelis, also known as  bulvių plokštainis ("potato pie"), is a potato dish from Lithuania. Potatoes, bacon, milk, onions, and eggs are seasoned with salt and pepper and flavoured, for example with bay leaves and/or marjoram, then oven-baked. It is usually eaten with sour cream or pork rind with diced onions.

Similar dishes include the Jewish kugel and Belarusian potato babka.

References

Lithuanian cuisine
Potato dishes
Bacon dishes
Savory puddings
Baked foods